Nochiya may refer to:

Nochiya Tribe, an Assyrian tribe

Nochia may also refer to:
Nochia, Chania, a village in Chania regional unit, Crete, Greece